Joseph Henry Carter (27 July 1899 – 7 January 1977) was an English footballer who played at inside-forward. He won three England caps, scoring four goals. Carter won an FA Cup winner's medal with West Bromwich Albion in 1931, also helping the team win promotion to Division One in the same season. In September 1931 he became the first ever Albion player to be sent off at The Hawthorns. He played in the 1935 FA Cup Final when Albion finished as runners-up to Sheffield Wednesday. He died of dehydration in 1977.

Honours
West Bromwich Albion
FA Cup winners: 1931

References

External links
 

1899 births
1977 deaths
Footballers from Birmingham, West Midlands
English footballers
England international footballers
Association football inside forwards
West Bromwich Albion F.C. players
English Football League players
English Football League representative players
FA Cup Final players
Deaths by dehydration